Sue Ane Langdon is an American actress. She has appeared in dozens of television series and had featured roles in films such as A Guide for the Married Man and The Cheyenne Social Club, both directed by Gene Kelly, as well as The Rounders opposite Henry Fonda and Glenn Ford and two Elvis Presley movies, Roustabout and Frankie and Johnny.

She began her performing career singing at Radio City Music Hall and acting in stage productions. In the mid-1960s, she appeared in the Broadway musical The Apple Tree, which starred Alan Alda.

Her co-starring role on the television series  Arnie won her a Golden Globe Award for Best Supporting Actress-Television.

In 1976, she appeared in Hello Dolly at The Little Theatre on the Square. In 1978, she appeared in Chicago for Kenley Players in Columbus, Ohio. She was featured mainly in comedies, with an occasional dramatic film.

Biography

Early life
After graduating high school, Langdon enrolled at the University of North Texas. She was also briefly enrolled full-time at Idaho State University.

Career
Langdon's film debut came in The Great Impostor (1961), starring Tony Curtis. Langdon went on to have leading roles in films such as The Rounders (1965), Hold On! (1966), A Guide for the Married Man (1967), A Man Called Dagger (1967), The Cheyenne Social Club (1970), and A Fine Madness (1966) which led to her posing nude for Playboy magazine. In 1966, United Artists Pictures released Frankie and Johnny in which Langdon co-starred along with Elvis Presley, Donna Douglas and Harry Morgan. Her later films included The Evictors (1979), Without Warning (1980), Zapped! (1982), UHF (1989) and Zapped Again! (1990).

Langdon's first regular role on network series television came as the third actress to play Alice Kramden in Jackie Gleason's The Honeymooners sketches and shows. Preceded by Pert Kelton and Audrey Meadows and followed by Sheila MacRae and Meadows again, she shared a Life cover with Gleason promoting his 1962 return to weekly variety television.  A premature departure from the role following a brief four-week run left her mark on the American Scene Magazine era of Gleason's career a small one at best. The press reported at the time "incompatible personality differences" between "The Great One" and her. Four years later, MacRae took over the role for the color, hour-long musical versions.

Langdon was more frequently seen on the small screen in guest roles such as Kitty Marsh during the NBC portion (1959–1961) of Bachelor Father. The next year, she appeared twice on Rod Cameron's syndicated crime drama Coronado 9. In 1961, she made her first of three appearances on Perry Mason as Rowena Leach in "The Case of the Crying Comedian". In 1962, she appeared as nurse Mary Simpson in an episode of CBS's The Andy Griffith Show. (Another actress, Julie Adams, also played Nurse Mary on the Griffith show.) In another popular situation comedy, Langdon played a scatter-brained defendant on trial in a Dick Van Dyke Show episode called "One Angry Man".

Langdon made her second guest appearance on Perry Mason in 1964 as murder victim Bonnie in "The Case of the Scandalous Sculptor". Her third Perry Mason appearance was in the 1966 episode "The Case of the Avenging Angel" as Dorothy (Dotty) Merrill.  Her other guest appearances on TV programs included Gunsmoke, Tales of Wells Fargo, 77 Sunset Strip, Bourbon Street Beat, Room for One More, Shotgun Slade, Mannix, Thriller, Bonanza, Ironside, McHale's Navy, The Man from U.N.C.L.E., Banacek, The Wild Wild West, Hart to Hart, Three's Company, The Love Boat, and Happy Days and as herself on Rowan and Martin's Laugh In.

She co-starred in two television series in the  1970s. Arnie, a sitcom starring actor Herschel Bernardi, debuted in 1970 and aired for two seasons on CBS. Langdon portrayed Lillian Nuvo, the wife of a loading-dock foreman turned corporate executive, and won a Golden Globe award for her performance. Grandpa Goes to Washington, an NBC hour-long comedy starring veteran actor Jack Albertson, featured Langdon as Rosie Kelley, the daughter-in-law of an over-65 maverick United States Senator.  Premiering in 1978 opposite Happy Days and Laverne and Shirley, the top-rated block of shows at the time, her third attempt at weekly episodic television lasted four months. A final stab at her own series came in the ABC comedy When the Whistle Blows.  A 1980 mid-season replacement, Langdon played Darlene Ridgeway, the owner of a saloon frequented by local construction workers. Another rare 60-minute comedy, it lasted 10 weeks.

Langdon was presented one of the Golden Boot Awards in 2003 for her contribution to television and cinema Westerns.

Personal life

Langdon married Jack Emrek on April 4, 1959, in Las Vegas, Nevada. The couple remained married until his death on April 27, 2010, in Calabasas, California. Emrek was a motion picture, stage, and television director. The couple had no children.

References

External links

20th-century American actresses
American television actresses
American film actresses
Living people
Actors from Paterson, New Jersey
Best Supporting Actress Golden Globe (television) winners
Western (genre) film actresses
University of North Texas alumni
Actresses from New Jersey
21st-century American women
Year of birth missing (living people)